The 17th Hong Kong Film Awards ceremony, honored the best films of 1997 and took place on 26 April 1998 at Hong Kong Academy for Performing Arts, Wan Chai, Hong Kong. The ceremony was hosted by Carol Cheng and Cheung Tat Ming, during the ceremony awards are presented in 17 categories.

Awards
Winners are listed first, highlighted in boldface, and indicated with a double dagger.

References

 Official website of the Hong Kong Film Awards

1998
1997 film awards
1998 in Hong Kong
Hong